Cymbastela coralliophila is a species of marine sponge in the family Axinellidae.

The sponge was first described in 1992 by John Hooper  and Patricia Bergquist.

It occurs along the Queensland coast, where it is found subtidally to depths up to 20 m, inhabiting coral reefs and  lagoon and reef slopes, in waters with surface temperatures from 20 to 30°C. It has also been found off the eastern tip of New Guinea. It is a sessile, filter feeder.

References

Axinellidae
Taxa named by Patricia Bergquist
Taxa named by John Hooper (marine biologist)